Spring: The Appendix is an album by Norwegian musician Finn Coren, and is the follow-up to 1997's Spring. As with its predecessor, all words are by William Blake and music by Coren.

Track listing
 "Spring"
 "The Little Vagabond"
 "Nurse's Song"
 "The Wild Flower's Song I"
 "A Poison Tree"
 "The Tyger" ('93 Version)
 "The Lamb"
 "Soft Snow"
 "The Angel"
 "The Fly" (Norwegian Folk Version)
 "Song: How Sweet I Roamed From Field to Field"
 "The Wild Flower's Song II"

1998 albums
Musical settings of poems by William Blake